UFC on Fox: Johnson vs. Moraga (also known as UFC on Fox 8) was a mixed martial arts event held on July 27, 2013, at the Key Arena in Seattle, Washington.  The event was broadcast live on FX and Fox.

Background
The main event was a UFC Flyweight Championship bout between champion Demetrious Johnson and top contender John Moraga.  The pairing was originally expected to take place on April 13, 2013 at The Ultimate Fighter 17 Finale.  However, Johnson was forced out of the bout with an injury and Moraga was pulled from that event as well.

Michael Chiesa was originally set to face Reza Madadi on this card. However, on May 14, 2013, it was announced Madadi pulled out of the bout citing alleged visa issues and was replaced by Jorge Masvidal.

Miesha Tate was pulled from her scheduled bout with Liz Carmouche to participate as coach on The Ultimate Fighter 18 and was replaced by Jéssica Andrade.

Tarec Saffiedine was expected to make his promotional debut at this event opposite Robbie Lawler; however, Saffiedine was forced out of the bout with an injury and was replaced by Siyar Bahadurzada. On July 11, it was announced that Bahadurzada also pulled out of the bout and was replaced by Bobby Voelker.

Matt Mitrione was expected to face Brendan Schaub at the event.  However, in mid-July, Mitrione pulled out of the bout citing an injury and Schaub was pulled from the event as well with the pairing rescheduled to UFC 165.

Danny Castillo was expected to face Bobby Green at the event, however, in mid-July, Green pulled out of the bout citing an injury and was replaced by Tim Means.

Yves Edwards was expected to fight Spencer Fisher on this card.  However, on July 11, Fisher was removed from the bout due to injury and replaced by Daron Cruickshank.

Both John Albert and Tim Means missed weight for their respective fights; rather than use time to cut additional weight, both men forfeited 20 percent of their purses to their opponent and the bouts were made catchweight affairs.

Results

Bonus awards
The following fighters were awarded $50,000 bonuses.

 Fight of The Night: Ed Herman vs. Trevor Smith
 Knockout of The Night: Melvin Guillard
 Submission of the Night: Demetrious Johnson

Reported Payout

The following is the reported payout to the fighters as reported to the Washington State Department of Licensing. It does not include sponsor money and also does not include the UFC's traditional "fight night" bonuses.

Demetrious Johnson: $58,000 (includes $29,000 win bonus) def. John Moraga: $17,000
Rory MacDonald: $48,000 (includes $24,000 win bonus) def. Jake Ellenberger: $52,000
Robbie Lawler: $156,000 (includes $78,000 win bonus) def. Bobby Voelker: $12,000
Liz Carmouche: $24,000 (includes $12,000 win bonus) def. Jéssica Andrade: $8,000
Jorge Masvidal: $66,000 (includes $33,000 win bonus) def. Michael Chiesa: $15,000
Danny Castillo: $58,000 (includes $29,000 win bonus) def. Tim Means: $12,000 ^
Melvin Guillard: $84,000 (includes $42,000 win bonus) def. Mac Danzig: $30,000
Daron Cruickshank: $20,000 (includes $10,000 win bonus) def. Yves Edwards: $21,000
Ed Herman: $74,000 (includes $37,000 win bonus) def. Trevor Smith: $8,000
Germaine de Randamie: $18,000 (includes $9,000 win bonus) def. Julie Kedzie: $9,000
Justin Salas: $16,000 (includes $8,000 win bonus) def. Aaron Riley: $8,000
Yaotzin Meza: $20,000 (includes $10,000 win bonus) def. John Albert: $10,000 ^

^ John Albert and Tim Means were reportedly fined 20 percent of their purse for failing to make the required weight for their fights. The Washington State Department of Licensing's initial report did not include information on the penalty.

See also
List of UFC events
2013 in UFC

References

External links
Official UFC past events page
UFC events results at Sherdog.com

Fox UFC
2013 in mixed martial arts
Mixed martial arts in Washington (state)
Sports competitions in Seattle
2013 in sports in Washington (state)
Events in Seattle